Pfeil ("Arrow") was the name given to two separate U-boat "wolfpacks" of Nazi Germany during World War II.

Pfeil 1 (Sep 1942)
The first wolfpack comprised 11 U-boats and operated from 12 September 1942 to 22 September 1942. This pack patrolled both sides of the Atlantic Ocean, preying on merchant vessels coming to Europe from the Americas.

U-boats involved

Raiding Success
Pfeil 1 was responsible for the sinking of 0 ships in the Atlantic Ocean.

Pfeil 2 (Feb 1943)
The first wolfpack comprised 13 U-boats and operated from 1 February 1943 to 9 February 1943. This pack patrolled both sides of the Atlantic Ocean, preying on merchant vessels coming to Europe from the Americas.

U-boats involved

Raiding Success
Pfeil 2 was responsible for the sinking of 11 ships (54,326 GRT) plus 1 ship damaged (9,272 GRT) in the Atlantic Ocean.

Bibliography

Sources

Wolfpacks of 1942
Wolfpacks of 1943
Wolfpack Pfeil
Wolfpack Pfeil